The Humpbacked Horse (tr.:Konyok Gorbunok, that is The Little Horse - Little Humpback), is a 1947 Soviet/Russian traditionally animated feature film directed by I. Ivanov-Vano and produced by the Soyuzmultfilm studio in Moscow. The film is based on the poem by Pyotr Pavlovich Yershov, and because of this, it is spoken in rhyme. The English dub has few rhymes and is not an overall feature.

A remake also by Ivanov-Vano and Soyuzmultfilm was released in 1975. This version, translated in English by George Molko, was released on October 25, 1977 as The Magic Pony.

Plot
An old man has three sons: the elder two are considered fairly smart, while the youngest, Ivan, is considered a "fool." One day the father sends the three to find out who's been taking the hay in their fields at night. The elder brothers decide to lie hidden in a haystack, where they promptly fall asleep. Ivan, meanwhile, sits beside a birch tree and plays on his recorder. Suddenly, he sees a magnificent horse come flying out of the sky. Ivan grabs her mane and holds on as the horse tries to shake him off. Finally, the horse begs him to let her go and in return gives him two beautiful black male horses and a little humpbacked horse (Konyok-gorbunok) to be his companion.

Ivan leads the two black horses to a stable and runs off with Konyok-gorbunok to fetch them buckets of water. When he comes back, he finds that his brothers have taken his horses. Konyok-gorbunok tells him that they will catch them in the city, so Ivan sits on its back and they go flying through the clouds. Along the way, Ivan finds the fiery feather of a firebird, which shines without giving off any heat, and takes it despite Konyok-gorbunok'''s warning that it will cause him difficulty later.

They reach the city, and Ivan outwits his brothers and sells his black horses to the Tsar. When it is found that nobody can control them except Ivan, he is put in charge of the Tsar's stables. Spalnik, one of the Tsar's courtiers (identified as a chamberlain in the original Russian and either a soothsayer or a groom in various English dubbings), takes a disliking to Ivan and hides himself in the stables to watch him at work so that he can think of a way to remove him from the Tsar's favour. After seeing Ivan use the firebird's feather for light, he steals it from him and shows it to the Tsar, who commands Ivan to catch him a firebird or lose his post.

With Konyok-gorbunoks help, Ivan catches one and brings it back to the Tsar. Spalnik tells the Tsar to make Ivan catch a beautiful Tsar-Maid, so the Tsar summons him and tells him that the consequences will be dire if he doesn't bring her within three weeks. Ivan again manages to do this.

The elderly Tsar is overjoyed and begs the young maiden to marry him, but she refuses, telling him that she would only marry him if he were young and handsome, and that to become young and handsome he would need to bathe first in boiling milk, then in boiling water, and finally in freezing water. Spalnik tells him to try this out on Ivan first, hoping at last to be rid of his nemesis. The Tsar agrees, and when Ivan protests upon being told of this the Tsar orders him to be thrown into prison until everything is ready the next morning. Konyok-gorbunok comes to Ivan and through the prison bars tells him not to worry - to simply whistle for him in the morning and let him put a magic spell on the water so that it will not be harmful to him. Spalnik overhears this, and kidnaps Konyok-gorbunok just as he is walking away from Ivan.

In the morning, Ivan whistles for Konyok-gorbunok, who is tied up in a bag. He manages to free himself eventually, knocking Spalnik out a window and into a well. Spalnik presumably falls to his death when the rope holding the bucket breaks, and Konyok-gorbunok comes to Ivan's rescue at the last moment, putting a spell on the three cauldrons of water. Ivan jumps into the boiling milk, then the boiling water and then the freezing water, and emerges as a handsome young man instead of a boy. The young maiden falls in love with him and they walk away. Meanwhile, the Tsar gets excited and decides that he also wants to be young and handsome. However, the spell is no longer working, so after he jumps into the boiling milk he doesn't come back out. Ivan, meanwhile, takes the maiden as his own wife and becomes the new Tsar, with Konyok-gorbunok continuing to follow him as his friend.

Creators

AwardsVersion of 1947 1948 — the Honourable diploma on the III MKF in Mariana Laznyakh (CSR).
 1950 — the Special award of jury on the IV MKF in Cannes.Version of 1975' 1977 (November) — the Bronze medal for the best animated film on category of children's movies on the VI MKF in Tehran.

Interesting facts
 In the opening credits of 1947 version Ivan Ivanov-Vano is credited as "I. Vano", but the cast and narrator are uncredited.
 In the book "Shot Off-screen" Ivan Ivanov-Vano writes:

In film distribution, on a film studio there are letters with a request again to release "Konyok-gorbunok". But the movie negative was badly damaged, and to print new copies from it was impossible. When these lines were written, Vano finished work on the new version.

 In 1988 the USSR mail of the USSR released a series (6 pieces) of stamps "Animated films". One of brands was devoted to the animated film "Konyok-Gorbunok".
 Appreciation to the movie was given by Walt Disney, who showed it to his animators and artists.

1975 version
In 1975 Ivan Ivanov-Vano made another version of the same film. The 1975 film is 73 minutes long; 18 minutes longer than the original. Although the progression of scenes and their plot content is usually the same as in the original, the animation and specific actions of the characters are different; for example, a scene may be taken from a different angle or in a different location (all of the backgrounds were also newly-drawn). Sometimes a scene was drawn out, other times contracted (for example, the scene where Ivan first sees the white horse is much-simplified compared to 1947). The cartoon keeps the plot of Ivan getting Tsar-Maid's ring from the sea at her demand, with the help of a giant whale, absent in the 1947 cartoon.

This was done because the original film was then in a very bad shape and the technical expertise for a restoration did not exist. In 2004, with the technical expertise now existing in Russia, the original film was restored and released on DVD by Krupnyy Plan (Крупный План).

The 1975 version was redubbed, recut and released in the United States as The Magic Pony in October 25, 1977, with Erin Moran voicing the Magic Pony, Jim Backus as the voice of the Tsar, Hans Conried as Spalnik and Johnny Whitaker as Ivan. This version of the film was first released on VHS in the early 1980s by Video Warehouse, Inc, and later again in 1984 by Vestron Video through their Children's Video Library division. Starmaker Entertainment and Anchor Bay Entertainment released it on VHS again in 1995.

Another English dub was done in 1995 by Films by Jove for the series Stories from My Childhood.

Voices

Additional Voices

Diana Alton
Robb Cigne
John Craig
Wayne Heffley
Jason Wingreen
Sandra Wirth

Home video
Both versions of The Humpbacked Horse'' have been released on home video. In the 1980s, Videoprogrammoy Goskino USSR (Видеопрограммой Госкино СССР) released the film in the SECAM system, and later in the 1990s in the PAL system. The 1975 edition was released on home video by film association Krupny Plan in the early 1990s. Both were later released on VHS by Soyuzmultfilm, and also by Studio PRO Video in their collection "The Best Soviet Animated Films”.

The film has been issued on DVD from the 2000s on. The 1947 version has been restored and distributed by Krupny Plan. The 1975 version first received a DVD release in 2003, in the 5th release of “The Golden Collection of Favourite Cartoons”, and later on by Soyuzmultfilm in the animated film collection "Tale of a Fairy Tale".

See also
History of Russian animation
List of animated feature films
List of films based on poems

References

External links

 (duplicate IMDB entry)
  (Official Russian)
  (Russian with English subtitles)
  (English)
Konyok-gorbunok (1947) at animator.ru
Konyok-gorbunok (1975) at animator.ru
Konyok-gorbunok at myltik.ru (Russian)
The Little Humpbacked Horse (Конек-горбунок), 1947 and 1975 online in Russian and English at Soviet Cartoons Online

1947 animated films
1947 films
Films based on fairy tales
Films directed by Ivan Ivanov-Vano
Animated films about horses
Soviet animated films
Soyuzmultfilm
Films based on poems
Animated films based on Slavic mythology
Films based on Russian folklore
Russian children's fantasy films
1940s children's animated films
1940s Russian-language films
Soviet children's fantasy films